Telpino is a rural locality (a village) in Vozhbalskoye Rural Settlement, Totemsky  District, Vologda Oblast, Russia. The population was 11 as of 2002.

Geography 
Telpino is located 47 km west of Totma (the district's administrative centre) by road. Panovo is the nearest rural locality.

References 

Rural localities in Tarnogsky District